Antidorcas bondi, or Bond's springbok, is an extinct species of antelope whose fossils have been found in Zimbabwe and South Africa.

Description
Originally described as a species of gazelle, it was found to be related to the modern springbok based on cranial morphology. Due to its exceptionally hypsodont teeth, together with isotopic evidence, Bond's springbok is considered a specialized grazer.

Bond's springbok survived past the Pleistocene in South Africa, surviving until as recently as 5,000 BC.

References

Prehistoric bovids
Pliocene even-toed ungulates
Pleistocene even-toed ungulates
Pliocene mammals of Africa
Pleistocene mammals of Africa
Prehistoric mammals of Africa
Holocene extinctions
Cenozoic mammals of Africa
True antelopes